This list of South African musicians includes notable individual musicians as well as musical ensembles whose members are South African by birth or nationality.

A
Afrotraction
AKA, hip-hop artist and record producer
Akustika Chamber Singers, chamber choir from Pretoria
aKing, South African acoustic rock band
Amanda Black, Multi-award winning and platinum-selling Afro-soul singer-songwriter
Amampondo, award-winning traditional Xhosa percussion group from Cape Town
Anatii (born 1993), hip-hop artist and record producer
A-Reece (born 1997), hip-hop artist and lyricist
Leigh Ashton (born 1956), singer-songwriter from Johannesburg
Assagai, Afro-rock band
The Awakening, gothic rock

B
Babes Wodumo, gqom musician
Ballyhoo, 1980s pop band best known for the hit "Man on the Moon"
The Bang
Leonel Bastos (born 1956), Mozambiquan adult contemporary musician and producer working in South Africa
Battery 9
BlackByrd
Busiswa, house musician
BLK JKS
Elvis Blue, musician and songwriter
Boo!
Bles Bridges (1947–2000), singer
Stef Bos
Cristina Boshoff
Jonathan Butler, singer-songwriter and guitarist
The Brother Moves On
Brasse Vannie Kaap
Bright Blue, 1980s pop band, best known for the hit song "Weeping"
Buckfever Underground
Beatenberg
Bongo Maffin, kwaito music group
Boom Shaka
Bucie (born 1987), R&B and soul singer
Guy Buttery

C
Adrienne Camp, singer-songwriter
Captain Stu, ska, funk, punk, and soul fusion band
Arno Carstens, former lead singer of Springbok Nude Girls
Louise Carver
Cassette
Cassper Nyovest, rapper and record producer
Tony Cedras (born 1952), musician
Chad, (born 1993), rapper
Yvonne Chaka Chaka, singer
Chris Chameleon, solo artist, lead singer and bass guitarist for Boo
Blondie Chaplin, singer and guitarist
Jesse Clegg (born 1988)
Johnny Clegg (1953–2019)
Clout, 1970s rock group
Basil Coetzee (1944–1998), saxophonist
Mimi Coertse (born 1932), musician
Tony Cox (born 1954), guitarist
Crashcarburn
Crossingpoint, Christian progressive hardcore band
Cutting Jade
Civil Twilight
Crow Black Sky
Costa Titch (1995–2023), Amapiano rapper and dancer.

D
Da L.E.S (born 1985), hip-hop artist
Simphiwe Dana (born 1980)
Danny K (Daniel Koppel), R&B singer-songwriter
Kurt Darren, singer
Pierre de Charmoy
Steven De Groote (1953–1989), classical pianist and winner of the Van Cliburn International Piano Competition
Fanie de Jager (born 1949), operatic tenor
Die Antwoord
Die Heuwels Fantasties
Bonginkosi Dlamini (born 1977), poet, actor and singer, also known as Zola
Dollar Brand (born 1934)
Donald, singer
Dorp
Downfall
Dr Victor and the Rasta Rebels, reggae
Dreamteam, hip-hop group from Durban
Jabulani Dubazana, singer, Ladysmith Black Mambazo
Lucky Dube (1964–2007)
Ampie du Preez, singer and guitarist
Johnny Dyani (1945–1986), jazz double bassist
DJ Speedsta , Hip Hop Dj

E
Dennis East, singer
Shane Eagle (b. 1996), hip-hop artist
Alton Edwards, singer
Eden, pop band
Elaine, singer and songwriter
Endorphine
Emtee (b. 1992), hip-hop artist
Dawid Engela (1931–1967), composer and musicologist
éVoid, 1980s new wave
Erica Eloff, soprano

F
The Fake Leather Blues Band
Falling Mirror
Brenda Fassie (1964–2004)
Ricky Fataar (born 1952), drummer
Duncan Faure, singer-songwriter formerly with the band Rabbitt
Mongezi Feza (1945–1975), trumpet player and flautist
Anton Fig, drummer
Josh Fix
Fokofpolisiekar, Afrikaans rock band
Foto na Dans, Afrikaans rock band
Four Jacks and a Jill
Johnny Fourie (1937–2007), jazz guitarist
Freshlyground
Fuzigish
Fifi Cooper

G
Hotep Idris Galeta (born 1941), jazz pianist
Goldfish
Anton Goosen (born 1946), singer
Die Grafsteensangers
Goodluck

H
Half Price (band)
Paul Hanmer, composer, pianist, and jazz musician
The Helicopters
Ken E Henson (born 1947), musician
Henry Ate
Sonja Herholdt
Hog Hoggidy Hog
Steve Hofmeyr (born 1964), singer and actor
Die Heuwels Fantasties

I
Abdullah Ibrahim (born 1934)
Zaki Ibrahim
iFANi
Isochronous

J
Jabu Khanyile (1957–2006)
Jack Parow
Robbie Jansen (1949–2010)
Jeremy Loops (born 1986), modern folk, singer
Jesse Jordan Band
Theuns Jordaan (born 1971), singer and songwriter
Claire Johnston (born 1967), lead singer of Mango Groove
Trevor Jones (born 1949), composer
Armand Joubert
Joy, a vocal group
John Edmond (born 1936), singer 
John Ireland (born 1954), singer and songwriter
Julian Bahula, jazz drummer*Juluka
Just Jinjer (previously Just Jinger)
JR, rapper
Junkyard Lipstick
L-Tido (born 1982), hip-hop artist, aka 16V

K
Kabelo Mabalane (born 1976), kwaito artist, former member of TKZee
Kalahari Surfers
Wouter Kellerman, South African flautist
Johannes Kerkorrel (1960–2002)
Sibongile Khumalo (born 1957), singer
Francois Klark, pop singer based in Canada
KOBUS!
Koos Kombuis (born 1954)
John Kongos (born 1945)
Kongos
Gé Korsten (1927–1999)
David Kramer (born 1951)
Kwesta, hip-hop artist and poet
K.O, hip-hop artist and record producer
Kyle Watson, record producer and DJ

L
Felix Laband, electronic musician
Riku Lätti, songwriter, composer, music producer
Ladysmith Black Mambazo (born 1960), isicathamiya group
Don Laka, jazz musician, pianist, producer
Robert Lange (born 1948), music producer
Lani Groves
Lark
Jack Lerole (c.1940–2003), tin whistle player; singer
Solomon Linda, songwriter
Lira
Locnville
Steve Louw
Roger Lucey, singer and guitarist
Lucky Dube, singer and keyboard player

M
 MVZZLE (born ), record producer 
 Mark Haze, Rock singer
 Sipho Mabuse (born 1951), singer
Arthur Mafokate, kwaito singer and composer
Mahlathini and the Mahotella Queens, a mbaqanga band
Vusi Mahlasela (born 1965)
Makgona Tsohle Band (1964–1999), a mbaqanga instrumental band
Bongi Makeba (1950–1985), singer-songwriter
Miriam Makeba (1932–2008)
Malaika (group)
Petronel Malan (1974–), concert pianist
Man As Machine
Mandoza (born 1978), kwaito singer
Mango Groove
Mildred Mangxola (born 1944), singer in Mahlathini and the Mahotella Queens and member of the Mahotella Queens
Manfred Mann
MarcAlex, group known for the hit "Quick Quick"
Josef Marais (1905–1978)
Martin PK
Hugh Masekela (born 1939)
Dorothy Masuka (born 1935), jazz singer
Neels Mattheus (1935-2003), traditional musician
Dave Matthews (born 1967), lead singer and founding member of Dave Matthews Band
Irene Mawela (born 1940), veteran singer and composer
Illana May
Abednego Mazibuko, singer with Ladysmith Black Mambazo
Albert Mazibuko (born 1948), singer with Ladysmith Black Mambazo
Thandiswa Mazwai (born 1976)
Chris McGregor (1936–1990), jazz pianist and composer
Busi Mhlongo (1947–2010), singer, dancer and composer 
Mind Assault
Moreira Chonguica (born 1077), jazz saxophonist and producer
Kippie Moeketsi (1925–1983), saxophonist
Pops Mohamed (born 1949), jazz musician
Louis Moholo (born 1940), drummer
Matthew Mole
Lebo Morake (aka Lebo M)
Shaun Morgan (born 1980), singer also known as Shaun Morgan Welgemoed
Ike Moriz (born 1972), singer, composer and lyricist
Jean Morrison
Mshengu White Mambazo (1976–2003), junior choir of Ladysmith Black Mambazo
Colbert Mukwevho, reggae singer 
Russel Mthembu, singer with Ladysmith Black Mambazo
Moozlie (born 1992), hip-hop artist and television presenter
Muzi (born 1991), electronic musician
Moonchild Sanelly Musician and Dancer

N
Nádine (born 1982), singer-songwriter
The Narrow
Nasty C (born 1997), hip-hop artist and record producer
Bongani Ndodana-Breen, composer
Jim Neversink, alternative country singer-songwriter and guitarist
New Academics
Steve Newman
Bernoldus Niemand (1959–1995)
Simon "Mahlathini" Nkabinde (1937–1999), Mbaqanga singer
West Nkosi (1940–1998), mbaqanga musician
No Friends of Harry
Nobesuthu Mbadu (born 1945), singer in Mahlathini and the Mahotella Queens and member of the Mahotella Queens
Siphiwo Ntshebe (1974–2010), operatic tenor from New Brighton, Port Elizabeth
Ashton Nyte, solo artist as well as lead singer and producer of The Awakening
Thys Nywerheid
Nadia Nakai (born 1990), hip-hop artist

O 
Sarah Oates, violinist and associate leader Philharmonia orchestra
Wendy Oldfield, rock singer-songwriter
Oskido, record producer and songwriter

P
Jack Parow, hip-hop artist
The Parlotones
Al Paton, singer-songwriter, producer, and percussionist
Peter Toussaint
Petit Cheval
James Phillips, singer-songwriter also known as Bernoldus Niemand
Anke Pietrangeli (born 1982), winner of the second series of Idols
Dizu Plaatjies, founder and former lead singer of Amampondo
PJ Powers (born 1960)
Prime Circle
Professor (born 1978), Kwaito musician
Dudu Pukwana (1938–1990), saxophonist, pianist, and composer
Purified, Christian hip-hop artist
Patricia Majalisa, bubblegum artist

Q

 Qkumba Zoo

R
Rabbitt
Rouge (rapper)
Trevor Rabin (born 1954), musician
Dolly Rathebe (1928–2004)
Laurika Rauch, Afrikaans singer
Riddare av Koden
Surendran Reddy (1962–2010) pianist and composer
Riky Rick (born 1987), hip-hop artist and record producer
Robin Auld
Rooibaardt, rock band
Ray Phiri (1947-2017), Jazz, jazz fusion, reggae and mbaqanga musician

S

Sandy B
Savuka
Robert Schneider of The Apples in Stereo
Leon Schuster
Seether, formerly called Saron Gas, hard rock and alternative metal band
Gerard Sekoto (1913–1993)
Judith Sephuma
Jockey Shabalala (1943–2006), singer with Ladysmith Black Mambazo
Joseph Shabalala (born 1941), lead singer and founder of Ladysmith Black Mambazo
Msizi Shabalala (born 1975), singer with Ladysmith Black Mambazo
Sibongiseni Shabalala (born 1973), singer with Ladysmith Black Mambazo
Troye Sivan (born 1995), South African-born 
Thamsanqa Shabalala (born 1977), singer with Ladysmith Black Mambazo
Thulani Shabalala (born 1968), singer with Ladysmith Black Mambazo
Shane Eagle (born 1996), hip-hop artist and lyricist
Shiraz, band active between 1984 - 1984
Margaret Singana (1938–2000) 
Robert Sithole, pennywhistle player
Skylight (band)
Kyla-Rose Smith (born 1982), violinist and dancer
Sonja Herholdt
Enoch Sontonga, teacher, lay-preacher and composer who wrote "Nkosi Sikelel' iAfrika"
South African National Youth Orchestra
Springbok Nude Girls
Zanne Stapelberg (born 1977), opera soprano
Dale Stewart (born 1979)
Sterling EQ
Stimela band formed in 1982
Straatligkinders
Sugardrive
Valiant Swart
Okmalumkoolkat (born 1983), hip-hop artist
Stogie T , Hip Hop Artist

T

Tananas
Taxi Violence
Peta Teanet, singer
TKZee, kwaito group
Hilda Tloubatla (born 1942), lead singer of Mahotella Queens, and singer in Mahlathini and the Mahotella Queens
Tokollo Tshabalala, kwaito singer also known as Magesh
Peter Toussaint, singer-songwriter and guitar player
Toya Delazy, pop singer and pianist
Tribe After Tribe
Tuks, hip-hop artist
Tumi and the Volume
Tweak

U
Uhuru— Kwaito and afropop music group
Urban Creep

V
Bobby van Jaarsveld (born 1987), singer-songwriter and actor
Bok van Blerk (born 1978)
Van Coke Kartel
Amor Vittone (born 1972)
Valiant Swart (born 1965)

W
Watershed
Wargrave
Shaun Welgemoed (born 1978)
Heinz Winckler (born 1978), singer who won the first series of Idols
Winston's Jive Mixup
Wonderboom
Markus Wormstorm, electronic musician and composer

Y
Pretty Yende (born 1985), operatic soprano from Piet Retief, Mpumalanga
Yorxe (born 1998), singer and songwriter
YoungstaCPT (born 1991), rapper and songwriter

Z
Zahara, singer-songwriter and poet
Zebra & Giraffe
Karen Zoid (born 1978)
Zola (born 1977)
Zonke (born 1979)
DJ Zinhle, DJ and producer

See also
List of Afrikaans singers
Music of Namibia
Music of the Netherlands
Music of South Africa

References 

South African
Musicians
 
Musicians